Ramjerdi (also Romanized as Rāmjerdī; also known as Rāmgerdī, Rāmjerd, Rāmjerdāmjerdī, and Ramjird) is a village in Ramjerd-e Do Rural District, Dorudzan District, Marvdasht County, Fars Province, Iran. At the 2006 census, its population was 357, in 80 families.

References 

Populated places in Marvdasht County